Les Petits Chats is an 2015 documentary film about the popular Egyptian rock band Les Petits Chats which was formed in 1967.

Background
Work on the film started in 2009. On September 28, 2015, a trailer for the documentary  was posted online on Facebook. In a week, it attracted more than 55,000 views. According to Cairo Scene, film would take a closer look into the lives of the band members around the time of their popularity as well as prior to and post that period. Also to be looked at was the changes in personnel that took place over the years. The film took six years to complete from its original start date in 2009 and it was made during that period when Egypt was going through an upheaval from 2011 to 2016.

The director
Nakhla is the step-son of one of the band members.

Screenings
Before its completion and while still in the developmental stage, the film was shown during the Ismailia Film Festival in 2012.

In 2015, Cairo Scene mentioned that the film was to premiere at the Arabian Sights Film Festival in Washington DC on 16 and 17 October. The film was nominated for the festival's jury award.

A screening for the film was to take place at the Zamalek Cinema on Monday 8 May at 7 pm.

It was announced in the July 20, 2017 issue of The National that Sherif Nakhla's 2015 film about the band  was to be screened at Abu Dhabi’s Mina Zayed on Saturday 5 August.

Cast
 Wagdi Francis
 Ezzat Abu Ouf
 Omar Khairat
 Sadek Gellini
 Pino
 George Lucas
 Sobhi Bedeir
 Samir Sabry
 Mohamed Salmawy
 Mohamed Gohar
 Sherif Seif el Nasr

References

External links
 
 Middlewest Films presents Les Petits Chats
 Jaime le Chat French prochainement N.O Official website
  Al-Ahram Weekly article: Back to romance
 Cairo Scene: Sherif Nakhla On His Award Nominated Rockumentary 'Les Petits Chats'

2015 documentary films
2015 films
Egyptian documentary films
Films set in Egypt
Documentary films about rock music and musicians
2010s English-language films